Curren Sheldon is an American filmmaker, best known for his documentary, Heroin(e) for which he received Academy Award for Best Documentary Short Subject nomination with wife Elaine McMillion Sheldon at the 90th Academy Awards.

References

External links
  
 

American producers
American directors
American cinematographers
Peabody Award winners
Year of birth missing (living people)
Living people